The enzyme chondro-4-sulfatase (EC 3.1.6.9) catalyzes the reaction 

4-deoxy-β-D-gluc-4-enuronosyl-(1→3)-N-acetyl-D-galactosamine 4-sulfate + H2O  4-deoxy-β-D-gluc-4-enuronosyl-(1→3)-N-acetyl-D-galactosamine + sulfate

This enzyme belongs to the family of hydrolases, specifically those acting on sulfuric ester bonds.  The systematic name is 4-deoxy-β-D-gluc-4-enuronosyl-(1→3)-N-acetyl-D-galactosamine-4-sulfate 4-sulfohydrolase. This enzyme is also called chondroitin-4-sulfatase.

References

EC 3.1.6
Enzymes of unknown structure